Arthur Omre (17 December 1887, in Brunlanes – 16 August 1967) was a Norwegian novelist and writer of short stories.

Omre hailed from Vestfold. With a background as sailor, journalist, constructor in the United States, engineer in Oslo, businessman and entrepreneur, he went bankrupt in 1922. From then on he initiated a criminal career, and made a living from liquor smuggling, swindle and theft, also spending long periods in prison.

Following release from jail in 1935, Omre made his literary début with the novel Smuglere (Smugglers). The story is largely based on his own experiences, and is written in hardboiled style. Then came the follow-ups Flukten (1936), Sukkenes bro (1937) and Kristinus Bergmann (1938).

He was awarded Gyldendal's Endowment in 1938.

In 1939 he wrote the novel Intermesso, in 1940 Det onde øie, in 1941 Harmoni, and in 1942 Mysterium i Rolvsøy. He published several short story collections. Many of his short stories were first published in magazines, such as Arbeidermagasinet. In the 1950s he wrote the trilogy Mikkelfanten, Svarte-Paal and Ek & Co.

Selected works
 (novel)
 (novel)
 (novel)
 (novel)
 (novel)
 (novel)
 (novel)
 (short story collection)
 (novel)
 (short story collection)
 (short story collection)
 (short story collection)

References

1887 births
1967 deaths
People from Larvik
20th-century Norwegian businesspeople
20th-century Norwegian criminals
Norwegian male criminals
20th-century Norwegian engineers
20th-century Norwegian journalists
Norwegian prisoners and detainees
Norwegian sailors
Prisoners and detainees of Norway
Smugglers
20th-century Norwegian novelists
Norwegian crime fiction writers
Norwegian short story writers